The Peavey Delta Blues 210 is a guitar amplifier produced by Peavey Electronics. It is a tube amplifier designed for Blues musicians. The name is inspired by the Delta blues, an early style of blues music that originated in the Mississippi Delta. The Delta Blues 210 is a member of the Classic Series family of amplifiers, complemented by the Delta Blues 115 in the Peavey lineup.

Characteristics
30 watts RMS into 16 or 8 ohms
All-tube (three 12AX7 and four EL84 tubes)
2-channel preamp
Two 10 inch Blue Marvel speakers
Optical tremolo
Two channels
3-band passive EQ
Boost switch
Master reverb
Effects loop
External speaker jack

References

Instrument amplifiers
Peavey amplifiers